Ravenea sambiranensis is a species of flowering plant in the family Arecaceae. It is found only in Madagascar. It is threatened by habitat loss.

References

sambiranensis
Endemic flora of Madagascar
Least concern plants
Taxonomy articles created by Polbot
Taxa named by Joseph Marie Henry Alfred Perrier de la Bâthie
Taxa named by Henri Lucien Jumelle